ABC Television, is a Nepali television channel, established in 2008.  A news channel, headquartered in Kathmandu, it broadcasts in the Nepali language Chairman and Editor-In-Chief is Shubha Shankar Kandel (https://sskandel.com/) Kandel is doing a popular talk show named "outlook" every Saturday night. He is an author of more than a dozen media and political books.Kandel is President of Nepal Media Society (NMS).
ABC News television is run by ABC Media Group Pvt. Ltd. It stands for accuracy, balance and credibility which is the principle of journalism. This channel is covering a wide range of societal issues, especially subaltern as well marginalized people and community.

It is one of the most popular television channels among the four news-television channels in Nepal.

See also

 ABC Television (disambiguation)
 List of Nepali television stations
 History of Television in Nepal (biplav.com)

External links
 abcnepal.tv, *,the station's official website

Kathmandu
Nepali language
Television channels in Nepal
Television channels and stations established in 2008
2008 establishments in Nepal